Clover or trefoil are common names for plants of the genus Trifolium (from Latin tres 'three' + folium 'leaf'), consisting of about 300 species of flowering plants in the legume or pea family Fabaceae originating in Europe. The genus has a cosmopolitan distribution with highest diversity in the temperate Northern Hemisphere, but many species also occur in South America and Africa, including at high altitudes on mountains in the tropics. They are small annual, biennial, or short-lived perennial herbaceous plants, typically growing up to 30 cm tall. The leaves are trifoliate (rarely quatrefoiled; see four-leaf clover), monofoil, bifoil, cinquefoil, hexafoil, septfoil, etcetera, with stipules adnate to the leaf-stalk, and heads or dense spikes of small red, purple, white, or yellow flowers; the small, few-seeded pods are enclosed in the calyx. Other closely related genera often called clovers include Melilotus (sweet clover) and Medicago (alfalfa or Calvary clover).

Cultivation
Several species of clover are extensively cultivated as fodder plants. The most widely cultivated clovers are white clover, Trifolium repens, and red clover, Trifolium pratense. Clover, either sown alone or in mixture with ryegrass, has for a long time formed a staple crop for silaging, for several reasons: it grows freely, shooting up again after repeated mowings; it produces an abundant crop; it is palatable to and nutritious for livestock;  it fixes nitrogen, reducing the need for synthetic fertilizers; it grows in a great range of soils and climates; and it is appropriate for either pasturage or green composting.

In many areas, particularly on acidic soil, clover is short-lived because of a combination of insect pests, diseases and nutrient balance; this is known as "clover sickness". When crop rotations are managed so that clover does not recur at intervals shorter than eight years, it grows with much of its pristine vigor.

Clovers are most efficiently pollinated by bumblebees, which have declined as a result of agricultural intensification. Honeybees can also pollinate clover, and beekeepers are often in heavy demand from farmers with clover pastures. Farmers reap the benefits of increased reseeding that occurs with increased bee activity, which means that future clover yields remain abundant. Beekeepers benefit from the clover bloom, as clover is one of the main nectar sources for honeybees.

Trifolium repens, white or Dutch clover, is a perennial abundant in meadows and good pastures. The flowers are white or pinkish, becoming brown and deflexed as the corolla fades. Trifolium hybridum, alsike or Swedish clover, is a perennial which was introduced early in the 19th century and has now become naturalized in Britain. The flowers are white or rosy, and resemble those of Trifolium repens. Trifolium medium, meadow or zigzag clover, a perennial with straggling flexuous stems and rose-purple flowers, has potential for interbreeding with T. pratense to produce perennial crop plants.

Other species are: Trifolium arvense, hare's-foot trefoil; found in fields and dry pastures, a soft hairy plant with minute white or pale pink flowers and feathery sepals; Trifolium fragiferum, strawberry clover, with globose, rose-purple heads and swollen calyxes; Trifolium campestre, hop trefoil, on dry pastures and roadsides, the heads of pale yellow flowers suggesting miniature hops; and the somewhat similar Trifolium dubium, common in pastures and roadsides, with smaller heads and small yellow flowers turning dark brown.

Uses
Clover is foraged by wildlife, including bears, game animals, and birds. Native Americans ate the plants raw and cooked, drying and smoking the roots. The seeds from the blossoms were used to make bread. It is also possible to make tea from the blossoms.

Symbolism
Shamrock, the traditional Irish symbol, which according to legend was coined by Saint Patrick for the Holy Trinity, is commonly associated with clover, although alternatively sometimes with the various species within the genus Oxalis, which are also trifoliate.

Clovers occasionally have four leaflets, instead of the usual three. These four-leaf clovers, like other rarities, are considered lucky. Clovers can also have five, six, or more leaflets, but these are rarer still. The clovers outer leaf structure varies in physical orientation. The record for most leaflets is 56, set on 10 May 2009. This beat the "21-leaf clover", a record set in June 2008 by the same discoverer, who had also held the prior Guinness World Record of 18.

A common idiom is "to be (or to live) in clover", meaning to live a carefree life of ease, comfort, or prosperity.

A cloverleaf interchange is named for the resemblance to the leaflets of a (four-leaf) clover when viewed from the air.

Phylogeny
The first extensive classification of Trifolium was done by Zohary and Heller in 1984. They divided the genus into eight sections: Lotoidea, Paramesus, Mistyllus, Vesicamridula, Chronosemium, Trifolium, Trichoecephalum, and Involucrarium, with Lotoidea placed most basally. Within this classification system, Trifolium repens falls within section Lotoidea, the largest and least heterogeneous section. Lotoidea contains species from America, Africa, and Eurasia, considered a clade because of their inflorescence shape, floral structure, and legume that protrudes from the calyx. However, these traits are not unique to the section, and are shared with many other species in other sections. Zohary and Heller argued that the presence of these traits in other sections proved the basal position of Lotoidea, because they were ancestral. Aside from considering this section basal, they did not propose relationships between other sections.
Since then, molecular data has both questioned and confirmed the proposed phylogeny from Zohary and Heller. A genus-wide molecular study has since proposed a new classification system, made up of two subgenera, Chronosemium and Trifolium. This recent reclassification further divides subgenus Trifolium into eight sections. The molecular data supports the monophyletic nature of three sections proposed by Zohary and Heller (Tripholium, Paramesus, and Trichoecepalum), but not of Lotoidea (members of this section have since been reclassified into five other sections). Other molecular studies, although smaller, support the need to reorganize Lotoidea.

Selected species
The genus Trifolium currently has 245 recognized species:

 Trifolium acaule A. Rich.
 Trifolium affine C. Presl
 Trifolium africanum Ser.
 Trifolium aintabense Boiss. & Hausskn.
 Trifolium albopurpureum Torr. & A. Gray – rancheria clover
 Trifolium alexandrinum L. – Egyptian clover, berseem clover
 Trifolium alpestre L.
 Trifolium alpinum L. – alpine clover
 Trifolium amabile Kunth
 Trifolium ambiguum M. Bieb.
 Trifolium amoenum Greene – showy Indian clover
 Trifolium andersonii A. Gray  – Anderson's clover or fiveleaf clover
 Trifolium andinum Nutt. – Intermountain clover
 Trifolium andricum Lassen
 Trifolium angulatum Waldst. & Kit.
 Trifolium angustifolium L.
 Trifolium apertum Bobrov
 Trifolium argutum Banks & Sol.
 Trifolium arvense L. – hare's-foot clover
 Trifolium attenuatum Greene
 Trifolium aureum Pollich – large hop trefoil
 Trifolium baccarinii Chiov.
 Trifolium badium Schreb.
 Trifolium barbeyi Gibelli & Belli
 Trifolium barbigerum Torr. – bearded clover
 Trifolium barnebyi (Isely) Dorn & Lichvar
 Trifolium batmanicum Katzn.
 Trifolium beckwithii W. H. Brewer ex S. Watson – Beckwith's clover
 Trifolium bejariense Moric.
 Trifolium berytheum Boiss. & Blanche
 Trifolium bifidum A. Gray – notchleaf clover
 Trifolium bilineatum Fresen.
 Trifolium billardierei Spreng.
 Trifolium bivonae Guss.
 Trifolium blancheanum Boiss.
 Trifolium bocconei Savi
 Trifolium boissieri Guss. ex Soy.-Will. & Godr.
 Trifolium bolanderi A. Gray
 Trifolium brandegeei S. Watson
 Trifolium breweri S. Watson – forest clover
 Trifolium brutium Ten.
 Trifolium buckwestiorum Isely – Santa Cruz clover
 Trifolium bullatum Boiss. & Hausskn.
 Trifolium burchellianum Ser.
 Trifolium calcaricum J. L. Collins & Wieboldt
 Trifolium calocephalum Fresen.
 Trifolium campestre Schreb. – hop trefoil
 Trifolium canescens Willd.
 Trifolium carolinianum Michx.
 Trifolium caucasicum Tausch
 Trifolium caudatum Boiss.
 Trifolium cernuum Brot.
 Trifolium cheranganiense J. B. Gillett
 Trifolium cherleri L.
 Trifolium chilaloense Thulin
 Trifolium chilense Hook. & Arn.
 Trifolium chlorotrichum Boiss. & Balansa
 Trifolium ciliolatum Benth. – foothill clover
 Trifolium cinctum DC.
 Trifolium clusii Godr. & Gren.
 Trifolium clypeatum L.
 Trifolium congestum Guss.
 Trifolium constantinopolitanum Ser.
 Trifolium cryptopodium Steud. ex A. Rich.
 Trifolium cyathiferum Lindl. – cup clover
 Trifolium dalmaticum Vis.
 Trifolium dasyphyllum Torr. & A. Gray
 Trifolium dasyurum C. Presl
 Trifolium davisii M. Hossain
 Trifolium decorum Chiov.
 Trifolium depauperatum Desv. – cowbag clover, balloon sack clover, or poverty clover
 Trifolium dichotomum Hook. & Arn.
 Trifolium dichroanthoides Rech. f.
 Trifolium dichroanthum Boiss.
 Trifolium diffusum Ehrh.
 Trifolium dolopium Heldr. & Hausskn. ex Gibelli & Belli
 Trifolium douglasii House
 Trifolium dubium Sibth. – lesser hop trefoil
 Trifolium echinatum M. Bieb.
 Trifolium elgonense J. B. Gillett
 Trifolium eriocephalum Nutt. – woollyhead clover
 Trifolium eriosphaerum Boiss.
 Trifolium erubescens Fenzl
 Trifolium euxinum Zohary
 Trifolium eximium Stephan ex Ser.
 Trifolium fragiferum L. – strawberry clover
 Trifolium friscanum (S.L. Welsh) S.L. Welsh
 Trifolium fucatum Lindl. – bull clover or sour clover
 Trifolium gemellum Pourr. ex Willd.
 Trifolium gillettianum Jacq.-Fél.
 Trifolium glanduliferum Boiss.
 Trifolium globosum L.
 Trifolium glomeratum L. – clustered clover or bush clover
 Trifolium gordejevii (Kom.) Z. Wei
 Trifolium gracilentum Torr. & A. Gray – pinpoint clover
 Trifolium grandiflorum Schreb.
 Trifolium gymnocarpon Nutt. – hollyleaf clover
 Trifolium haussknechtii Boiss.
 Trifolium haydenii Porter
 Trifolium heldreichianum (Gibelli & Belli) Hausskn.
 Trifolium hirtum All. – rose clover
 Trifolium howellii S. Watson – canyon clover or Howell's clover
 Trifolium hybridum L. – Alsike clover
 Trifolium incarnatum L. – crimson clover
 Trifolium israeliticum Zohary & Katzn.
 Trifolium isthmocarpum Brot.
 Trifolium jokerstii Vincent & Rand. Morgan
 Trifolium juliani Batt.
 Trifolium kingii S. Watson
 Trifolium lanceolatum (J. B. Gillett) J. B. Gillett
 Trifolium lappaceum L.
 Trifolium latifolium (Hook.) Greene
 Trifolium latinum Sebast.
 Trifolium leibergii A. Nelson & J. F. Macbr. – Leiberg's clover
 Trifolium lemmonii S. Watson – Lemmon's clover
 Trifolium leucanthum M. Bieb.
 Trifolium ligusticum Balb. ex Loisel.
 Trifolium longidentatum Nábelek
 Trifolium longipes Nutt. – longstalk clover
 Trifolium lucanicum Gasp. ex Guss.
 Trifolium lugardii Bullock
 Trifolium lupinaster L.
 Trifolium macilentum Greene
 Trifolium macraei Hook. & Arn. – Chilean clover, double-head clover, or MacRae's clover
 Trifolium macrocephalum (Pursh) Poir. – largehead clover
 Trifolium masaiense J. B. Gillett
 Trifolium mattirolianum Chiov.
 Trifolium mazanderanicum Rech. f.
 Trifolium medium L. – zigzag clover
 Trifolium meduseum Blanche ex Boiss.
 Trifolium meironense Zohary & Lerner
 Trifolium michelianum Savi.
 Trifolium micranthum Viv.
 Trifolium microcephalum Pursh – smallhead clover
 Trifolium microdon Hook. & Arn. – thimble clover
 Trifolium miegeanum Maire
 Trifolium monanthum A. Gray – mountain carpet clover
 Trifolium montanum L.
 Trifolium mucronatum Willd. ex Spreng.
 Trifolium multinerve A. Rich.
 Trifolium mutabile Port.
 Trifolium nanum Torr.
 Trifolium neurophyllum Greene
 Trifolium nigrescens Viv.
 Trifolium noricum Wulfen
 Trifolium obscurum Savi
 Trifolium obtusiflorum Hook. & Arn. – clammy clover
 Trifolium occidentale Coombe
 Trifolium ochroleucon Huds. - sulphur clover
 Trifolium oliganthum Steud. – fewflower clover
 Trifolium ornithopodioides L.
 Trifolium owyheense Gilkey
 Trifolium pachycalyx Zohary
 Trifolium palaestinum Boiss.
 Trifolium pallescens Schreb.
 Trifolium pallidum Waldst. & Kit.
 Trifolium pannonicum Jacq. – Hungarian clover
 Trifolium parnassi Boiss. & Spruner
 Trifolium parryi A. Gray
 Trifolium patens Schreb.
 Trifolium patulum Tausch
 Trifolium pauciflorum d'Urv.
 Trifolium petitianum A. Rich.
 Trifolium philistaeum Zohary
 Trifolium phitosianum N. Böhling et al.
 Trifolium phleoides Pourr. ex Willd.
 Trifolium physanthum Hook. & Arn.
 Trifolium physodes Steven ex M. Bieb.
 Trifolium pichisermollii J. B. Gillett
 Trifolium pignantii Brongn. & Bory
 Trifolium pilczii Adamović
 Trifolium pilulare Boiss.
 Trifolium pinetorum Greene
 Trifolium plebeium Boiss.
 Trifolium plumosum Douglas
 Trifolium polymorphum Poir.
 Trifolium polyodon Greene
 Trifolium polyphyllum C. A. Mey.
 Trifolium polystachyum Fresen.
 Trifolium praetermissum Greuter et al.
 Trifolium pratense L. – red clover
 Trifolium prophetarum M. Hossain
 Trifolium pseudostriatum Baker f.
 Trifolium purpureum  Loisel.
 Trifolium purseglovei J. B. Gillett
 Trifolium quartinianum A. Rich.
 Trifolium radicosum Boiss. & Hohen.
 Trifolium reflexum L. – buffalo clover
 Trifolium repens L. – shamrock (white clover)
 Trifolium resupinatum L. – Persian clover, shaftal
 Trifolium retusum L.
 Trifolium riograndense Burkart
 Trifolium roussaeanum Boiss.
 Trifolium rubens L.
 Trifolium rueppellianum Fresen.
 Trifolium salmoneum Mouterde
 Trifolium saxatile All.
 Trifolium scabrum L.
 Trifolium schimperi A. Rich.
 Trifolium scutatum Boiss.
 Trifolium sebastianii Savi
 Trifolium semipilosum Fresen.
 Trifolium setiferum Boiss.
 Trifolium simense Fresen.
 Trifolium sintenisii Freyn
 Trifolium siskiyouense J. M. Gillett
 Trifolium somalense Taub.
 Trifolium spadiceum L.
 Trifolium spananthum Thulin
 Trifolium spumosum L.
 Trifolium squamosum (or maritimum) L. – sea clover
 Trifolium squarrosum L.
 Trifolium stellatum L.
 Trifolium steudneri Schweinf.
 Trifolium stipulaceum Thunb.
 Trifolium stoloniferum Muhl. ex A. Eaton – running buffalo clover
 Trifolium stolzii Harms
 Trifolium striatum L. – knotted clover
 Trifolium strictum L.
 Trifolium subterraneum L. – subterranean clover
 Trifolium suffocatum L.
 Trifolium sylvaticum Gérard ex Loisel.
 Trifolium tembense Fresen.
 Trifolium thalii Vill.
 Trifolium thompsonii C. V. Morton – Thompson's clover
 Trifolium tomentosum L.
 Trifolium triaristatum Bertero ex Colla
 Trifolium trichocalyx A. Heller – Monterey clover
 Trifolium trichocephalum M. Bieb.
 Trifolium trichopterum Pančić
 Trifolium tumens Steven ex M. Bieb.
 Trifolium ukingense Harms
 Trifolium uniflorum L.
 Trifolium usambarense Taub.
 Trifolium variegatum Nutt. – whitetip clover
 Trifolium vavilovii Eig
 Trifolium velebiticum Degen
 Trifolium velenovskyi Vandas
 Trifolium vernum Phil.
 Trifolium vesiculosum Savi
 Trifolium vestitum D. Heller & Zohary
 Trifolium virginicum Small
 Trifolium wentzelianum Harms
 Trifolium wettsteinii Dörfl. & Hayek
 Trifolium wigginsii J. M. Gillett
 Trifolium willdenovii Spreng. − tomcat clover
 Trifolium wormskioldii Lehm. – cow clover

See also
 Clover honey
 Cloverleaf quasar
 Green manure

References

External links

Quattrofolium
Edibility of clover: Edible parts and visual identification of wild clover.
Nitrogen fixation

Forages
Garden plants
Groundcovers
Nitrogen-fixing crops
 
Taxa named by Carl Linnaeus